Jules Leleu (June 17, 1883 – 1961), was a French furniture designer.

Career
Born in Boulogne-sur-Mer, France, Leleu studied decorative painting and at the age of 26 succeeded his father in the family painting business. With his brother he began work in the Decorating field. After World War I, Leleu specialized in furniture making. He opened a Paris gallery, Maison Leleu, in 1924 and exhibited at the 1925 Exposition Industrielle et Arts Decoratifs, winning a grand prize at the exposition. Leleu designed the Grand Salon of the Ambassadors at the Society of Nations in Geneva and the French Embassies of several nations as well as the ocean liners SS Ile de France and SS Normandie. Jules Leleu worked with Alice Colonieu, she performed for Jules leleu two beautiful ceramic panels for the Ocean liner Pierre Loti.

External links
Mobilier national (France) : Jules Leleu

References

Leleu. Jules
1883 births
1961 deaths